The Regional Somali Language Academy (RSLA) is an intergovernmental regulating body for the Somali language in the Horn region. As of February 2015, it is based in Djibouti City.

Overview
On 28 June 2013, the Government of Djibouti, the Federal Government of Somalia and the Government of Ethiopia launched the Regional Somali Language Academy at a ceremony in Djibouti City. The event was organized by Djibouti's Ministry of Islamic Affairs, Culture and Waqf in conjunction with the Somali-Speaking PEN Centre of Djibouti, and was attended by around 50 prominent Somali-speaking intellectuals from the region and elsewhere. Among the guests were Somalia's Minister of Information, Posts and Telecommunications Abdullahi Elmoge Hersi, Somaliland’s Minister of Culture Abiib Diriye Nur, and the Vice President of the Somali Region of Ethiopia Abdihakim Igal Omar.

In January 2015, President of Somalia Hassan Sheikh Mohamud announced that the Regional Somali Language Academy was slated to be finalized in conjunction with the governments of Djibouti and Ethiopia. Among the scheduled projects was the construction of a new headquarters for the Academy in Mogadishu, in recognition of Somalia's traditional position as the center for the development and promotion of the Somali language. In February 2015, the foundation stone for the new Regional Somali Language Academy was officially laid at an inauguration ceremony in Mogadishu attended by President Mohamud, President of Djibouti Ismaïl Omar Guelleh, federal cabinet ministers, legislators and delegates.

The academy is the first such regional language regulator for Somali. It is officially mandated with preserving the Somali language and culture in Greater Somalia. , there is no representation for the Somali-speaking community in Kenya.

References

Language regulators
Government agencies established in 2013
Government of Djibouti
Government of Ethiopia
Government of Somalia
2013 establishments in Djibouti